Norbert Gombos was the defending champion but lost in the second round to Filip Horanský.

Tallon Griekspoor won the title after defeating Sebastián Báez 7–6(8–6), 6–3 in the final.

Seeds

Draw

Finals

Top half

Bottom half

References

External links
Main draw
Qualifying draw

Bratislava Open - 1